The 1982-83 Four Hills Tournament took place at the four traditional venues of Oberstdorf, Garmisch-Partenkirchen, Innsbruck and Bischofshofen, located in Germany and Austria, between 30 December 1982 and 6 January 1983.

Results

Overall

References

External links 
  

Four Hills Tournament
1982 in ski jumping
1983 in ski jumping
1982 in German sport
1983 in German sport
1983 in Austrian sport